The University of Luxembourg (French: Université du Luxembourg; German: Universität Luxemburg; Luxembourgish: Universitéit Lëtzebuerg) is a public research university in Luxembourg.

History 
The University of Luxembourg was founded in 2003 by combining four existing education and research institutes: the Centre universitaire, Institut supérieur d'études et de recherches pédagogiques, Institut supérieur de technologie, and Institut d'études éducatives et sociales. The university is the only public university in Luxembourg.

Description 

The university has three campuses: the Belval Campus, the Kirchberg Campus, and the Limpertsberg Campus.

The university is governed by a board of governors, a rector, and a university council. The current rector of the University of Luxembourg is Stéphane Pallage.

Academics 

The university offers seventeen bachelor's degrees, forty-six master's degrees, and doctorates. Bachelor's degrees require a semester abroad. The university also offers sixteen vocational training and lifelong learning training courses.

The university is multilingual. Courses are generally taught in two languages, being French and English or French and German. Some courses are taught in three languages and some courses are taught entirely in English.

The university has three faculties, the Faculty of Science, Technology, and Medicine; the Faculty of Law, Economics, and Finance; and the Faculty of Humanities, Education, and Social Sciences, and three interdisciplinary centres, the Interdisciplinary Centre for Security, Reliability and Trust; the Luxembourg Centre for Systems Biomedicine; and the Luxembourg Centre for Contemporary and Digital History. All the faculties offer baccalaureate, masters, doctoral, and vocational programs.

COVID-19 pandemic 
During the COVID-19 pandemic in Luxembourg as part of the worldwide COVID-19 pandemic, the university switched to remote learning and later hybrid learning.

Demographics 
As of March 2021, the University of Luxembourg enrollment was 6,783 students, 950 doctoral candidates, 2,245 staff, 1,420 academic staff, and 283 professors.

In 2021, the university had 4,858 had full-time equivalent students and a student–staff ratio of 19. In 2021, 51% of students at the university were international students.

Rankings 

In 2021, U.S. News & World Report ranked the University of Luxembourg number 653 in Best Global Universities and number 227 in Best Global Universities in Europe.

The Times Higher Education World University Rankings ranked the University of Luxembourg 201–250 in their 2020 World University Rankings and 12 in their 2020 Young University Rankings.

The Academic Ranking of World Universities, also known as the Shanghai Ranking, ranked the University of Luxembourg 601-700 in their 2020 rankings.

The Center for World University Rankings ranked the University of Luxembourg 907 in their 2020-2021 World University Rankings.

Research 
In March 2021, the University of Luxembourg had 1,000 ongoing research projects and 114 Horizon 2020 projects. In 2020, university researchers produced 2,104 publications.

Notable people 
The University of Luxembourg has more than 11,000 alumni.

Notable faculty 
 Alex Biryukov (Cryptographer)
 Robert Brisart (Philosopher)

 Emile Haag (Historian, national president of the confederation of government employees)
 Dietmar Heidemann (Philosopher)

 Norbert von Kunitzki (Economist, businessman and university president)

 Jean-Paul Lehners (Historian)

 Jeanne Peiffer (Historian of mathematics)

 Martin Schlichenmaier (Mathematician)
 Emma Schymanski (Chemist, environmental engineer)

 François Tavenas (Engineer and academic)
 Leon van der Torre (Computer scientist)

 Renée Wagener (Journalist, sociologist, historian, and former politician)

 Volker Zotz (Philosopher, religious studies scholar, Buddhologist)

Notable alumni 
 Djuna Bernard (Luxembourger politician)

 Amin Mekki Medani (Sudanese lawyer, diplomat, human rights and political activist)

 Jean-Paul Pier (Mathematician)
 Jean-François Rischard (Economist, World Bank vice president)

References

External links

 Official website (in French)
 Official website (in German)
 Official website (in English)

 
Education in Luxembourg City
University of Luxembourg
Educational institutions established in 2003
University of Luxembourg
Educational institutions in Luxembourg